John McLeod "Chip" Lohmiller (born July 16, 1966) is a former professional American football placekicker in the National Football League for the Washington Redskins, New Orleans Saints, and St. Louis Rams. He played college football at the University of Minnesota and high school football at Woodbury Senior High School.

College career
During Lohmiller's time at Minnesota, he was named to the All-Big Ten Conference first-team in 1986 and the second-team in 1987. By the end of his college career, Lohmiller became Minnesota's all-time leading scorer with 268 points (since broken by Dan Nystrom in 2002).

Professional career
Lohmiller was drafted in the second round (55th overall) of the 1988 NFL Draft by the Washington Redskins, for whom he played from 1988 to 1994. Lohmiller finished his career kicking for the New Orleans Saints (1995) and the St. Louis Rams (1996).

Notable moments
 On September 9, 1991, in a Monday Night Football game against the Dallas Cowboys, Lohmiller became the first player to kick four field goals of 45 yards or longer in a single game.  The Redskins won that game 33–31 after trailing 21–10 in the second quarter. That same season, he also kicked a field goal in a 16–13 overtime win against the Houston Oilers and two fourth-quarter field goals against the then–Phoenix Cardinals, breaking a 14–14 tie and giving the Redskins a 20–14 win after they trailed 14–0 at halftime. Another game decided by Lohmiller's foot was against the New York Giants when he provided the final four points (one extra point and one field goal) after the Redskins trailed 13–0 at the half but came back to tie the score and ultimately win.
 In Super Bowl XXVI on January 26, 1992, against Buffalo, he kicked two field goals late in the game that put the game out of reach in a 37–24 Redskins victory.  That season, he led the league in scoring with 149 points (more than the entire Indianapolis Colts, who had 143).

Personal
Lohmiller was the head coach for the Pequot Lakes High School football team in Pequot Lakes, Minnesota, where they advanced to their first state appearance in school history in 2009.

References

1966 births
Living people
American football placekickers
High school football coaches in Minnesota
Minnesota Golden Gophers football players
National Conference Pro Bowl players
New Orleans Saints players
People from Woodbury, Minnesota
Players of American football from Minnesota
St. Louis Rams players
Washington Redskins players